Omar Elabdellaoui (born 5 December 1991) is a Norwegian professional footballer who plays as a right back and as a right midfielder for Bodø/Glimt and the Norway national football team.

Elabdellaoui began his career with Skeid before signing with Manchester City in 2008. He never appeared for the club. He made his professional debut while on loan at Strømsgodset. He has also spent a loan spell in the Netherlands with Feyenoord. After spending a half season on loan with Eintracht Braunschweig in 2013, Elabdellaoui joined the German side permanently in May 2013. He signed for Olympiacos in June 2014 and stayed at the club until August 2020 when he moved to Galatasaray.

Elabdellaoui represented Norway at youth international level, and was with Norway in the 2013 UEFA European Under-21 Football Championship. He made his debut for the senior national team in August 2013.

Club career

Manchester City
After playing for the Norwegian club Skeid, Elabdellaoui joined the English club Manchester City when he was 16 years old. Scott Sellars, coach of the City's U18 team, stated in an interview with Norwegian TV 2 in January 2010 that Elabdellaoui had "a big future". Elabdellaoui made an impressive effort at the academy and was awarded a first-team number for the 2010–11 season, but sat on the bench during City's Europa League match against Juventus on 16 December 2010.

Strømsgodset
On 31 March 2011, the last day of the Norwegian transfer window, Elabdellaoui was loaned out to Strømsgodset in Norway until City's pre-season started in July. In Strømsgodset he was reunited with his teammates from City, Mohammed Abu and Razak Nuhu. He played eight league matches before fracturing his foot in the league match against Fredrikstad on 28 May 2011, and returned to Manchester for surgery. On 1 September, he returned to Strømsgodset where he played until the end of the 2011-season, in a total of 12 matches, scoring one goal and giving one assist.

Strømsgodset wanted Elabdellaoui for another loan-spell for the 2012 season, but Elabdellaoui was reluctant to play at Godset's home ground Marienlyst Stadion because he was concerned that its artificial turf would re-injure him.

Feyenoord
In June 2012, Elabdellaoui signed a two-year contract with City, and was loaned to the Dutch club Feyenoord for the 2012–13 season. His teammate at City, John Guidetti, who was loaned to the same club in the 2011–12 season, both recommended Elabdellaoui to Feyenoord and advised Eladbellaoui to accept Feyenoord's offer if Manchester City let him go. Guidetti said that Elabdellaoui was a perfect fit for Feyenoord because he was physically strong, technically well-equipped and a fast player. According to Feyenoord's technical director Martin van Geel, Elabdellaoui was to mostly play as a left or right winger, but would also play as an attacking midfielder behind the forwards. He also said that Feyenoord wanted Eladbellaoui on their team for a couple of years, but were unable to sign him previously.

Elabdellaoui played five matches for Feyenoord, four as a substitute, until he in January 2013 requested to be released from the club. He wanted to play regularly and realized that his chances at Feyenoord would be limited, where he were competing against the right back and the right wing at the Netherlands national team.

Eintracht Braunschweig

In January 2013, Elabdellaoui was loaned to German club Eintracht Braunschweig for the second half of the 2012–13 2. Bundesliga season. He became a regular from the start and won promotion to the Bundesliga with his team. On 10 May, the club announced that the loan deal had been made permanent.

Following their promotion, he made his debut in the top flight against Werder Bremen on 10 August 2013. He started the first three matches of the season as a right back, but sat on the bench in the next match against Hamburg.

Olympiacos

On 17 June 2014 he was offered a contract by Greek club Olympiacos. He signed for the club the next day, stating that he was very excited to be a part of the club.

Loan to Hull City
On 20 January 2017, Elabdellaoui signed a loan deal with Hull City, linking him with his international teammates Markus Henriksen and Adama Diomande. Hull were given the option to make the deal permanent at the end of the season. He made his debut two days later in the 2–0 away loss to Chelsea.

Return to Olympiacos
Elabdellaoui's form during the 2018–19 season attracted interest from other clubs, though Olympiacos said they would have had to offer a minimum of 5 million euros.

Elabdellaoui was made club captain for the 2019–20 season and made 47 appearances in all competitions playing an important role in his side winning the Greek Super League.

In August 2020, he announced that he was leaving the club.

Galatasaray
Following his departure from Olympiacos, Elabdellaoui signed a three-year deal with Turkish club Galatasaray worth a reported €4,050,000 in salary over the course of his contract.

On 31 December 2020, during the New Year celebrations, fireworks exploded in Elabdellaoui's hands. He was transferred to hospital for treatment, with specific concern over injuries to his eyes.

Elabdellaoui returned to training in July 2021, wearing protective glasses. On 11 February 2022, according to various reports, and after a marathon with more than 10 eye surgeries, Elabdellaoui is preparing to play again. He had to go to the USA, where his eyes were literally reconstructed and with the help of his sister, but also of an anonymous donor, he managed to continue and complete the required surgeries. 

His contract was unilaterally terminated by Galatasaray on 2 September 2022.

Return to Norway
In December 2022 he signed a contract with Bodø/Glimt for the 2023 and 2024 seasons.

International career

Elabdellaoui made his debut for Norway when he played for the under-15 team in the 0–0 draw Poland U15 on 8 August 2006, in a match where Stefan Johansen also made his debut at youth international level. Elabdellaoui played one more match for the under-15 team before he scored one goal in ten matches for the under-16 team. He later scored one goal in eight matches for the under-17 team, before he made six appearances for the under-18 team and eleven for the under-19 team, where he scored one goal.

Elabdellaoui made his debut for the Norway national under-21 football team against Greece U-21 on 17 October 2010. He featured heavily in the 2013 UEFA European Under-21 Football Championship qualification as a right-back.

He made his debut for the Norway under-23 team in a game against Wales in June 2012, with Elabdellaoui as the first goalscorer in the 4–0 victory.

Elabdellaoui was first called up for the Norwegian national team for the friendly match against Sweden in August 2013, and made his debut for the senior team when he started the match and played 72 minutes as a right back.

Personal life
Elabdellaoui is of Moroccan descent and is the cousin of Mohammed Abdellaoue and Mustafa Abdellaoue.

Career statistics

Club

International
.

Honours
Olympiacos
Super League Greece: 2014–15, 2015–16, 2016–17, 2019–20

Norway U21
UEFA European Under-21 Championship bronze: 2013

Individual
Norwegian Footballer of the Year: 2015
Super League Greece Team of the Year: 2014–15, 2018–19, 2019–20

References

External links

 
 
 
 

1991 births
Living people
Footballers from Oslo
Norwegian people of Moroccan descent
Association football fullbacks
Association football midfielders
Norwegian footballers
Norway international footballers
Norway under-21 international footballers
Norway youth international footballers
Skeid Fotball players
Manchester City F.C. players
Strømsgodset Toppfotball players
Feyenoord players
Eintracht Braunschweig players
Olympiacos F.C. players
Eliteserien players
Eredivisie players
Bundesliga players
Hull City A.F.C. players
2. Bundesliga players
Super League Greece players
Norwegian expatriate footballers
Expatriate footballers in England
Expatriate footballers in the Netherlands
Expatriate footballers in Germany
Expatriate footballers in Greece
Expatriate footballers in Turkey
Norwegian expatriate sportspeople in England
Norwegian expatriate sportspeople in the Netherlands
Norwegian expatriate sportspeople in Germany
Norwegian expatriate sportspeople in Greece
Norwegian expatriate sportspeople in Turkey
Premier League players
Galatasaray S.K. footballers
Süper Lig players
People from Surnadal
FK Bodø/Glimt players